The Urban Music People (often simply the UMP Awards) are Malawi's urban music industry awards, established in 2015, and also include Fashion, and Media sister awards. Most of the categories are dichotomized into male and female. The ceremony is held annually, usually in late November or December, with the judging process starting in October of the same year. The nominations are typically announced at the end of September. The winners receive a gold-plated statuette.

Current Award Categories
Music
 Best Hip Hop Act
 Best Dancehall Act
 Song of the Year
 Music Video of the Year
 Album of the Year
 Artist of the Year (Female)
 Artist of the Year (Male)
 Best Gospel Act
 Best New Artist (Female)
 Best New Artist (Male)
 Producer of the Year
 Best Duo/Group
 Lifetime Achievement

Media
 Media Legend
 Best TV personality 
 Best Radio DJ/Personality 
 Best Entertainment writer

Fashion
 Living Legend
 Fashion Icon
 Model of the Year
 Designer of the Year
 Most Fashionable Celebrity

Host Cities

See also
Music of Malawi
Website

References

Music video awards
African music awards